Asia United Bank Corporation, commonly known as Asia United Bank or AUB is a universal bank in the Philippines. It is among the very few banks that was granted a full-branch commercial banking license in 1997 and is operating until this day. In 2013, AUB joined the league of Philippine banks that have become publicly listed and acquired universal banking status. As of 2022, AUB is the thirteenth largest bank in the Philippines in terms of assets.
 

AUB was registered with the Securities and Exchange Commission (SEC) on October 3, 1997. Its registered office and principal executive offices are located at Joy-Nostalg Center, 17 ADB Avenue, Ortigas Center, Pasig City, Philippines.

AUB was granted the authority to operate as a commercial bank under the Monetary Board (MB) Resolution No. 1149 dated September 3, 1997 and commenced operations on October 31, 1997. In 2012, it obtained approval from the Bangko Sentral ng Pilipinas (BSP) to upgrade its license into expanded commercial banking status. In 2013, the bank was granted an authority to operate as a universal bank under MB Resolution No. 356 dated February 28, 2013. The universal banking license authorizes, AUB, in addition to its general powers as a commercial bank, to exercise the following: (1) Powers of an investment house, including securities underwriting and trading, loan syndication, financial advisory, private placement of debt and equity securities, project finance and direct equity investment, and (2) Power to invest in allied and non-allied enterprises, subject to regulatory caps on the amount of investment relative to the bank's capital and ownership percentage.

See also

List of banks in the Philippines
BancNet

References

Banks of the Philippines
Banks established in 1997
Companies based in Pasig
Companies listed on the Philippine Stock Exchange